The Kansas Argyles were a men's indoor soccer team that played regionally in the Southwest Indoor Soccer League (SISL). Based in Wichita, Kansas, the team was composed of local players and managed by Ian Anderson, former Scottish International, NASL, MISL player, and Randy Schuessler.

The team ceased operations after the 1986–1987 season.

Defunct indoor soccer clubs in the United States
1987 disestablishments in Kansas
Year of establishment missing
Defunct soccer clubs in Kansas
Sports in Wichita, Kansas
Association football clubs disestablished in 1987